Julio César Gandarilla Bermejo (1943 – 24 November 2020) was a Cuban politician who served as Minister of the Interior from January 2017 until his death.

Life and career
Gandarilla Bermejo was born in 1943 in Matanzas Province, Cuba.

Gandarilla Bermejo was a founder of the National Revolutionary Militia. He was a vice admiral in the Cuban Revolutionary Armed Forces, and fought in the Angolan Civil War. He was head of the Military Counterintelligence Directorate for 16 years. Gandarilla Bermejo was a member of the Communist Party of Cuba, and a deputy in the National Assembly of People's Power.

In 2015, Gandarilla Bermejo became First Deputy Minister of the Ministry of the Interior, replacing Carlos Fernández Gondín, who became Minister of the Interior. In January 2017, he became Minister of the Interior, succeeding Carlos Fernández Gondín who had died earlier that month, becoming the sixth Minister of the Interior since the role was created in 1961. In the same month, he signed a memorandum of understanding with outgoing US president Barack Obama. Whilst Minister of the Interior, he introduced legislation aimed at repressing opposition and dissent. Some of the legislation was criticised by human rights organisations for allegedly violating freedom of speech.

In October 2019, Gandarilla Bermejo signed a memorandum of understanding with the Russian Security Council. The following month, the US banned Gandarilla Bermejo from entering the country due to Cuba's support for socialist Nicolás Maduro during the Venezuelan presidential crisis. His two sons were also sanctioned by the US. Gandarilla Bermejo did not have a Twitter account, even though Cuban president Miguel Díaz-Canel said all senior leaders should have one.

Death
Gandarilla Bermejo died of cancer on 24 November 2020.  He was cremated without a public funeral ceremony.

References

1943 births
2020 deaths
Government ministers of Cuba
People from Matanzas Province
Deaths from cancer in Cuba
Communist Party of Cuba politicians
Members of the National Assembly of People's Power
Cuban military personnel of the Angolan Civil War
20th-century Cuban military personnel
21st-century Cuban military personnel
Vice admirals